Steelhead may refer to:
Rainbow trout, fish also known as steelhead trout
Steelhead trout

Places
Steelhead Beach Regional Park, in California
Steelhead Provincial Park, in British Columbia

People
 Albert Steelhead (b 1858), native of Sweden, became a pioneer photographer in Chewelah, Washington

Other uses
Mississauga Steelheads, Canadian junior hockey team
Nexus Q, an Android media streaming device codenamed Steelhead
Steelhead, a WAN appliance from Riverbed Technology